A 4-4-6, in the Whyte notation for the classification of steam locomotives by wheel arrangement, is a locomotive with:
 four (4) leading wheels (at the front of the locomotive)
 four (4) driving wheels (2 axles) fixed in a rigid frame, and
 six (6) trailing wheels (normally mounted in a trailing truck).
The only example of this wheel arrangement was the Thuile locomotive.

Other equivalent classifications are:
 UIC classification: 2B3 (also known as German classification
 Italian classification), and
 French classification: 223.

 
4,4-4-6